Douglas Richards Kennedy (September 14, 1915 – August 10, 1973) was an American supporting actor originally from New York City who appeared in more than 190 films between 1935 and 1973.

Early years 
Kennedy was the son of Mr. and Mrs. Dion W. Kennedy. He attended Deerfield Academy in Deerfield, Massachusetts, and afterwards graduated from Amherst College in Amherst, Massachusetts. He served in the U. S. Army from 1940 to 1945.

Career
Kennedy was a character player and occasional leading man in Hollywood. Making his debut in 1935, he played a significant number of supporting roles and was able to secure contract-player status, first at Paramount Pictures and later at Warner Brothers.

His acting career was interrupted by World War II service as a major in the Signal Corps with the Office of Strategic Services and Army Intelligence. After that, he returned to films and played character roles, often western villains or territorial marshals, as well as isolated leads in low-budget pictures.

Kennedy had a starring role in the syndicated series Steve Donovan, Western Marshal, with Eddy Waller as his sidekick, Rusty Lee. He was also one of the policemen who vanishes in the science fiction classic, Invaders from Mars.

He played the gunfighter William P. Longley in a 1954 episode of the syndicated television series Stories of the Century, starring and narrated by Jim Davis. 

In the 1957 (season one) Perry Mason episode 'The Case of the Moth-Eaten Mink' he played the part of Det. Sgt. Jaffrey, eventually revealed as the murderer.

In 1958, he appeared as Steven Boles  in the Perry Mason episode "The Case of The Lucky Loser". In 1960, he appeared as the murderer Lucky Sterling in Perry Mason episode 'The Case of the Wary Wildcatter'. In 1965, he appeared as Brady Duncan in the Perry Mason episode "The Case of the Fatal Fetish".

In 1958, Kennedy appeared in Jim Davis' second series, Rescue 8 in the episode "Calamity Coach". In the story line, rescuers Wes Cameron (Davis) and Skip Johnson (Lang Jeffries) work to rescue three actors on location when a stagecoach tumbles down a mountain. 

On January 12, 1959, Kennedy appeared in the episode "Shadow of a Gunfighter" of the NBC western series The Restless Gun. He plays a former gunfighter, Cal Winfield, who is informed that Vint Bonner, (John Payne), is responsible for the death of Winfield's son. Cal Winfield then comes out of retirement to extract vengeance. Robert Fuller appears in the episode as Jim Winfield. 

Kennedy played the role of Jay Brisco in the 1959 episode "Law West of the Pecos" of the ABC/Warner Brothers western series, Colt .45. Frank Ferguson portrayed Judge Roy Bean, and Lisa Gaye was cast as June Webster. 

Later, Kennedy portrayed the sheriff, Fred Madden, of ABC's The Big Valley, with Barbara Stanwyck. He made his last appearance in 1973 in three episodes of CBS's Hawaii Five-O, with Jack Lord.

Personal life and death
Kennedy was married to Isabell Russell, and they had a son, Douglas Kennedy Jr.

Kennedy died of cancer at the age of fifty-seven in Honolulu, Hawaii, where he had been for the shooting of Hawaii Five-O. He is interred at National Memorial Cemetery of the Pacific in Honolulu.

Selected appearances

Films

'G' Men (1935) – Agent – 1949 Reissue Scenes (uncredited)
Women Without Names (1940) – Secretary (uncredited)
Opened by Mistake (1940) – State Trooper (uncredited)
Those Were the Days! (1940) – Allen
The Way of All Flesh (1940) – Timothy
The Ghost Breakers (1940) – Intern (uncredited)
Rhythm on the River (1940) – Party Guest (uncredited)
Arise, My Love (1940) – College Boy (uncredited)
North West Mounted Police (1940) – Constable Carter
Love Thy Neighbor (1940) – Doorman at Rehearsal (uncredited)
The Mad Doctor (1941) – Hotel Clerk (uncredited)
The Great Mr. Nobody (1941) – Mr. McGraw
The Round Up (1941) – Trooper
Here Comes Happiness (1941) – Announcer (voice, uncredited)
Strange Alibi (1941) – Reporter (uncredited)
Affectionately Yours (1941) – Airline Official (uncredited)
The Nurse's Secret (1941) – Dr. Keene
The Bride Came C.O.D. (1941) – Second Reporter
Passage from Hong Kong (1941) – Jeff Hunter
The Unfaithful (1947) – Roger
Nora Prentiss (1947) – NYC Emergency Room doctor
Stallion Road (1947) – Horse Show Announcer (uncredited)
Possessed (1947) – Asst. District Attorney
Deep Valley (1947) – Guard (uncredited)
Life with Father (1947) – Morley – Young Clergyman (uncredited)
Dark Passage (1947) – Detective Kennedy
The Unsuspected (1947) – Bill (uncredited)
That Hagen Girl (1947) – Herb Delaney
Always Together (1947) – Doberman
The Voice of the Turtle (1947) – Naval Officer
April Showers (1948) – Narrator (voice, uncredited)
To the Victor (1948) – Steve
Romance on the High Seas (1948) – Car Salesman (uncredited)
The Big Punch (1948) – Football Broadcaster (voice, uncredited)
Embraceable You (1948) – Dr. Wirth
Johnny Belinda (1948) – Mountie (uncredited)
Adventures of Don Juan (1948) – Don Rodrigo
The Decision of Christopher Blake (1948) – J. Roger Bascomb (uncredited)
Whiplash (1948) – Costello
One Sunday Afternoon (1948) – Jasper (uncredited)
John Loves Mary (1949) – Col. McGaw (uncredited)
Flaxy Martin (1949) – Hap Richie
South of St. Louis (1949) – Lee Price
A Kiss in the Dark (1949) – Radio Concert Broadcaster (voice, uncredited)
Homicide (1949) – Opening Off-Screen Narrator (voice, uncredited)
Flamingo Road (1949) – Police Radio Broadcaster (voice, uncredited)
Look for the Silver Lining (1949) – Doctor (uncredited)
The Fountainhead (1949) – Reporter (uncredited)
One Last Fling (1949) – Vic Lardner
South of Rio (1949) – Henchman Bob Mitchell
It's a Great Feeling (1949) – Opening Off-Screen Narrator (uncredited)
Task Force (1949) – Ship's Radio (voice, uncredited)
The House Across the Street (1949) – Opening Narrator (voice, uncredited)
Fighting Man of the Plains (1949) – Ken Vedder
Ranger of Cherokee Strip (1949) – Joe Bearclaws
East Side, West Side (1949) – Alec Dawning
Montana (1950) – Rodney Ackroyd
Backfire (1950) – Heard on Radio (voice, uncredited)
Barricade (1950) – Clay's Man (uncredited)
Ma and Pa Kettle Go to Town (1950) – George Donahue (uncredited)
The Next Voice You Hear... (1950) – Mitch (uncredited)
The Cariboo Trail (1950) – Murphy
Convicted (1950) – Det. Bailey
Chain Gang (1950) – Cliff Roberts
Revenue Agent (1950) – Steve Daniels – IRS agent
The Du Pont Story (1950) – Coleman du Pont
Oh! Susanna (1951) – Trooper Emers
The Lion Hunters (1951) – Marty Martin
I Was an American Spy (1951) – Sgt. John Phillips
The Texas Rangers (1951) – Dave Rudabaugh
China Corsair (1951) – Capt. Frenchy
Callaway Went Thataway (1951) – Drunk
Indian Uprising (1952) – Cliff Taggert
For Men Only (1952) – Dean Oliver Harland Mayberry
Fort Osage (1952) – George Keane
Hoodlum Empire (1952) – Henchman Brinkley (uncredited)
Last Train from Bombay (1952) – Kevin / Brian O'Hara
Ride the Man Down (1952) – Harve Garrison
Torpedo Alley (1952) – Lt. Dora Gates
San Antone (1953) – Captain Garfield, U.S. Cavalry
Jack McCall, Desperado (1953) – 'Wild' Bill Hickok
Invaders from Mars (1953) – Tall Cop Jackson Who Vanishes (uncredited)
Safari Drums (1953) – Brad Morton
Gun Belt (1953) – Mel Dixon
War Paint (1953) – Trooper Clancy
Mexican Manhunt (1953) – Dan McCracken
All American (1953) – Tate Hardy
Invaders from Mars (1953) – Helicopter Pilot
Rails Into Laramie (1954) – Telegraph Operator
The Lone Gun (1954) – Gad Moran
Massacre Canyon (1954) – Sergeant James Marlowe
The High and the Mighty (1954) – Boyd, Public Relations (uncredited)
The Big Chase (1954) – Police Lt. Ned Daggert
Sitting Bull (1954) – Col. Custer
Cry Vengeance (1954) – Tino Morelli
Wyoming Renegades (1955) – Charlie Veer
Strange Lady in Town (1955) – Slade Wickstrom
The Eternal Sea (1955) – Capt. Walter Riley
Wiretapper (1955) – Charles Rumsden
Strange Intruder (1956) – Parry Sandborn
The Last Wagon (1956) – Col. Normand
Miami Exposé (1956) – Dan McCracken
Last of the Badmen (1957) – Hawkins
Hell's Crossroads (1957) – Frank James
The Land Unknown (1957) – Capt. Burnham
Chicago Confidential (1957) – Ken Harrison
Rockabilly Baby (1957) – Tom Griffith
The Bonnie Parker Story (1958) – Tom Steel
The Lone Ranger and the Lost City of Gold (1958) – Ross Brady
Good Day for a Hanging (1959) – Voice of Gang Member (uncredited)
Lone Texan (1959) – Maj. Phillip Harvey
The Alligator People (1959) – Dr. Wayne MacGregor
The Amazing Transparent Man (1960) – Joey Faust
Flight of the Lost Balloon (1961) – Sir Hubert Warrington
The Fastest Guitar Alive (1967) – Joe
The Destructors (1968) – General

TV shows

Fireside Theatre (1951–1953) – Stafford / Dan / Joe / Will Paton
Cavalcade of America (1953)
Schlitz Playhouse of Stars (1953–1954) – Lt. Mark Randall / Col. Robert Edwards / Tom Babcock
Hopalong Cassidy (1954) – Stacy Keller
Letter to Loretta (1954) – Roger Stevens
Stories of the Century (1954) – Bill Longley
Climax! (1954) – Uncle Gavin
The Lone Ranger (1950–1955)
Science Fiction Theatre (1955) – Col. R.J. Barton
Annie Oakley (1955) – Ralph Putnam / Jim Hayward
Matinee Theatre (1955–1956)
Dragnet (1955–1967) – Agent Tom Ashford
Steve Donovan, Western Marshal (1955–1956) – Marshal Steve Donovan
Alfred Hitchcock Presents (1956–1959) – Union Officer / Austin / Jonathan Dalliford
Tales of Wells Fargo (1957) – Clancy, Martin Yates
Cheyenne (1957) – Blake Holloway
Perry Mason (1957–1965)
Studio One (1958) – Mr. Gordon
Tombstone Territory (1958) – Sam Colby
The Rough Riders (1958) – Sgt. True
Bronco (1958) – Paul Duquesne
Wanted: Dead or Alive (1958) – Sheriff Hank Bedloe
Cimarron City (1958) – Sam Thaw
Northwest Passage (1958) – Eli Dillon
Jefferson Drum (1958) – Dallas
Wagon Train (1958–1959) – Col. Hillary / John Loring
Maverick (1958–1959) – McFearson / Connors
Bat Masterson (1959) – Sheriff Jeb Crater
Alcoa Presents: One Step Beyond (1959) – Sgt. Cooper
General Electric Theater (1959) – Sam Allen
The Restless Gun (1959) – Sheriff / Cal Winfield
The Lineup (1959)
Colt .45 (1959) – Jay Brisco
Zorro (1959) – Manuel Larrios
Wyatt Earp (1959) – Dave Mather
Pony Express (1960) – General Tate / Marshal Jeb Loring
Laramie (1960) – Gunrunner
The Texan (1959–1960) – Sheriff / Jason Quarles
Rawhide (1959–1965) – Nat Benson / Maxey / Ewan Dangerfield
Bonanza (1959–1968) – Sheriff Sam Purcell / Jonathan Frazier / Big Charlie Monahan / Stoney / Bill Stewart
Have Gun - Will Travel (1960) – Wynn Loring
Lock-Up (1960) – Gavin Bledsoe
Riverboat (1960) – McLeish
The Rifleman (1960) – Pete Crandell
Pony Express (1960) – General Tate / Marshal Jeb Loring
Sugarfoot (1960) – Sheriff Williams
Gunsmoke (1960–1966) – John Stoner / Talbot / Yancey Cliver / Traych
Ripcord (1961) 
The Everglades (1961–1962) – Mike Flint / Dan Martin
The Outer Limits (1965) – Gen. Daniel Pettit
The Legend of Jesse James (1965) – Ben Todd
The Big Valley (1965–1969) – Sheriff Fred Madden / Marshal / Alexander Morrison / Mc Coll
Lassie (1964–1966) – Dale Jensen / Father
The Virginian (1966–1967) – Mr. Oliver / Sheriff
Cade's County (1971) – Capt. Steve Hoover
O'Hara, U.S. Treasury (1972) – Policeman
Hawaii Five-O (1973) – Turner Carr / Sinclair / Fleming (final appearance)

Career notes

External links

All Movie Guide

1915 births
1973 deaths
20th-century American male actors
American male film actors
American male television actors
Amherst College alumni
Burials in the National Memorial Cemetery of the Pacific
Deaths from cancer in Hawaii
Deerfield Academy alumni
Male actors from Greater Los Angeles
Male actors from Massachusetts
Male actors from New York (state)
People of the Office of Strategic Services
United States Army officers
United States Army personnel of World War II